Audeen W. Fentiman is an American engineer, and Crowley Family Professor in Engineering Education, at Purdue University. She is Associate Dean of Graduate Education and Interdisciplinary Programs. She is a fellow of the American Nuclear Society. She won a Sharon Keillor Award for Women in Engineering Education.

Life
She graduated from Glenville State College (Mathematics, minor, physics), West Virginia University (Mathematics), and Ohio State University (Nuclear Engineering).

Works

References

External links
http://www2.ans.org/about/election/statements/fentiman.html
http://ansnuclearcafe.org/2010/11/16/audeen-fentiman-testifies-before-the-blue-ribbon-commission/

Year of birth missing (living people)
Living people
American writers
Ohio State University College of Engineering alumni
Purdue University faculty
West Virginia University alumni
Glenville State College alumni